JoyTunes Ltd. (DBA Simply ) is a privately held company developing software that teaches creative hobbies, from playing music to drawing and more. The company started out creating mobile apps that teach learners around the world how to play musical instruments, initially the piano and later branching out to other instruments such as the guitar with interactive listening system called MusicSense that can tell acoustically how well you're playing a piano, guitar or a MIDI keyboard. 

In July 2022, JoyTunes announced that it was rebranding as Simply, corresponding with the company's leading products Simply Piano, Simply Guitar, Simply Sing and Simply Tune.

Investors
JoyTunes raised $7M from angel investors and VCs.  In Aug 2014, JoyTunes raised $5 million in Series A funding led by Aleph VC and with participation from Formation 8 and Genesis Partners. Angel investors include the former CEO of Steinway Musical Instruments, Dana Messina and Zohar Gilon.

In 2019, JoyTunes announced that it raised $25 million in a round led by Tel Aviv-based venture capital firm Qumra Capital and later that year raised $50 million from Google Ventures, Qualcomm Ventures and Hearst Ventures. The company has raised $97 million to date.

References

Software companies of Israel
Companies based in Tel Aviv
Musical training software
Software companies established in 2010